Doin' It Again is an album by saxophonist David Liebman which was recorded in Brooklyn in 1979 and released on the Dutch Timeless label.

Reception

The AllMusic review by Steve Loewy stated, "Considering what Liebman's quintet was able to achieve on If They Only Knew this one is a bit of a disappointment ... While there are plenty of good moments throughout this recording, there are better examples of the saxophonist's work."

Track listing 
All compositions by David Liebman except where noted
 "Doin' It Again" – 9:41  
 "Lady" (Ron McClure) – 9:36
 "Stardust" (Hoagy Carmichael, Mitchell Parish) – 9:22  
 "Cliff's Vibes" – 8:54

Personnel 
David Liebman – tenor saxophone, soprano saxophone
Terumasa Hino – trumpet, flugelhorn, percussion
John Scofield – guitar
Ron McClure – bass, electric bass
Adam Nussbaum – drums

References 

 

Dave Liebman albums
1980 albums
Timeless Records albums